The men's light heavyweight event was part of the boxing programme at the 1976 Summer Olympics. The weight class allowed boxers of up to 81 kilograms to compete. The competition was held from 19 to 31 July 1976. 18 boxers from 18 nations competed.

Medalists

Results
The following boxers took part in the event:

First round
 Vilmos Jakab (HUN) def. Mohamed Mama (GHA), walk-over
 Juan Domingo Suarez (ARG) def. Hocine Tafer (FRA), KO-1
 Janusz Gortat (POL) def. Miloslav Popović (YUG), 3:2
 Georgi Stoymenov (BUL) def. Ernesto Sanchez (VEN), 5:0
 Leon Spinks (USA) def. Abellatif Fatihi (MAR), KO-1
 Anatoliy Klimanov (URS) def. Roger Fortin (CAN), 5:0
 Joan Montane (AND) def. Gabriel Daramola (NGA), walk-over
 Ottomar Sachse (GDR) def. Louis Ngatchou (CMR), walk-over

Second round
 Sixto Soria (CUB) def. José Rosa (PUR), KO-2
 Wolfgang Gruber (FRG) def. Frederick Sabat (KEN), walk-over
 Costică Dafinoiu (ROM) def. Robert Nixon (GUY), walk-over
 Robert Burgess (BER) def. Seifu Mekonnen (ETH), walk-over
 Juan Domingo Suarez (ARG) def. Vilmos Jakab (HUN), KO-1
 Janusz Gortat (POL) def. Georgi Stoymenov (BUL), AB-3
 Leon Spinks (USA) def. Anatoliy Klimanov (URS), 5:0
 Ottomar Sachse (GDR) def. Joan Montane (AND), RSC-3

Quarterfinals
 Sixto Soria (CUB) def. Wolfgang Gruber (FRG), KO-2
 Costică Dafinoiu (ROM) def. Robert Burgess (BER), 5:0
 Janusz Gortat (POL) def. Juan Domingo Suarez (ARG), 4:1
 Leon Spinks (USA) def. Ottomar Sachse (GDR), 5:0

Semifinals
 Sixto Soria (CUB) def. Costică Dafinoiu (ROM), AB-1
 Leon Spinks (USA) def. Janusz Gortat (POL), 5:0

Final
 Leon Spinks (USA) def. Sixto Soria (CUB), RSC-3

References

Light Heavyweight